Mahmoud  Melmasi was contemporary poet and scholar. He was a descendant of Homam-e Tabrizi. He was born on 1917 in Tabriz.

He learn reading and writing before of five years old from his father and than from Mirza Mohsen Adib Ulama. After some months he went to school. He finished Gulistan of Sa'di on nine years old and Kalyleh and Demne on thirteen years old. These part of learning cause to interest to Persian literature.

He married with daughter of Sayed Ibrahim Darvazeie to six child, five boys (Aladdin, Roknaddin, Zya’aldyn, Fereydoun and Farrokh) and one daughter.

One of the prominent scholars of the late M. illuminati was this village, in his weighty book (learning partners) on Page 368 and 369 in family and child Mlmasy family descendant, the late Mr. Aladdin Mlmasy would be said: the descendants of the late Azam TabriziGod protect Bdarad tongue injury.
[Edit] Death

He died on 23 Jun 1991 and was buried in the Maqbaratoshoara.

20th-century Iranian poets
People from Tabriz
Burials in Maqbaratoshoara